The album 1 fois 5, released in 1976, includes the greatest hits of the artists Robert Charlebois, Gilles Vigneault, Yvon Deschamps and Jean-Pierre Ferland, interpreted on Mount Royal on Saint-Jean-Baptiste Day.

The following year, the album won the prize of the Académie Charles Cros.

The Show
Two years after the  concert , the organisers of the celebrations for the National Holiday in 1976 (the 23 June) decided to create another giant outdoor concert. This time, the political content and the sense of identity needed to be stronger, and five singers were chosen instead of three. The members of the concert of 1974 were rapidly thrown together, each artist providing their own musicians. In 1976, an orchestra were provided, with much time for practice, collaborations, and even a collaborative composition session, which led to Chacun dit je t'aime. The concert took place twice, in Québec on the Plaines d'Abraham, on 21 June 1976 and in Montréal on Mount Royal, on 23 June 1976. The patriotism in songs like Gens du pays (sung by all five) is mostly in the songs by Vigneault, but also Charlebois' The frog song. The rocker had already performed his songs successfully two years previously, therefore he had to perform songs from his new record, Longue distance. A new version of Fu Man Chu was also performed. Charlebois also sung a duet with Léveillée on Les vieux pianos with two pianos on stage. All five contributed parts of their traditional-influenced songs in the La même gigue medley. The sound is better than on the previous album, and 1 Fois 5 is a good example of singer-songwriters from the 1970s in Québec and of the nationalism of the time.
The last replaying of the concert was done at Radio-Québec, on Saint-Jean-Baptiste in 1997.
At Saint-Jean-Baptiste on 23 June 2006, France D'Amour, Anik Jean, Marjo, Andrée Watters and Marie-Hélène Fortin of the group Mes Aïeux revisited the classic songs of the five singers in a special performance marking the 30th anniversary of the 1 fois 5 concert.
Eventually, GSI Musique worked for several months on the version of the "Une fois 5" concert recording, releasing a record and video of the concert together with Radio-Québec who owned the rights to the visual aspects of the concert. The release date has been set to June 1, 2010, for the CD/DVD of this legendary concert.

Songs on record
--Disc 1--

 Gens du pays / les 5
 The frog song / Robert Charlebois
 Il me reste un pays / Gilles Vigneault
 L'étoile d'Amérique / Claude Léveillée
 Aimons-nous / Yvon Deschamps
 Le petit roi / Jean-Pierre Ferland
 Tout l'monde est malheureux / Gilles Vigneault
 Les fesses / Yvon Deschamps
 Les vieux pianos / Robert Charlebois et Claude Léveillée
 Mon ami J.C. / Jean-Pierre Ferland
 La grande valse fofolle / Claude Léveillée
 Le doux chagrin / Les 5
 a) Vive les Jeux olympiques ; b) J'sais pas comment, j'sais pas pourquoi / Yvon Deschamps
 Chacun dit je t'aime / les 5
 Ce matin un homme / Claude Léveillée
 Mon ami Fidel / Robert Charlebois
 Les gens de mon pays / Gilles Vigneault
 Un peu plus haut, un peu plus loin / Jean-Pierre Ferland
 La même gigue / les 5
 Gens du pays / les 5

Songs of the concert
 Gens du pays / les 5
 Marie-Claire / Jean-Pierre Ferland
 The frog song / Robert Charlebois
 Il me reste un pays / Gilles Vigneault
 L'étoile d'Amérique / Claude Léveillée
 Aimons-nous / Yvon Deschamps
 C'est extraordinaire (dialogue) / Les 5
 Tout l'monde est malheureux / Gilles Vigneault
 La grande valse fofolle / Claude Léveillée
 Les fesses / Yvon Deschamps
 Les vieux pianos / Robert Charlebois et Claude Léveillée
 Le doux chagrin / Les 5
 Mon ami Fidel / Robert Charlebois
 Mon ami J.C. / Jean-Pierre Ferland
 Fu Man Chu (Chu D'dans) / Robert Charlebois
 Vive les jeux olympiques (monologue)/ Yvon Deschamps
 J'sais pas comment, j'sais pas pourquoi / Yvon Deschamps
 Le petit roi / Jean-Pierre Ferland
 Ce matin un homme / Claude Léveillée
 Les gens de mon pays / Gilles Vigneault
 Un peu plus haut, un peu plus loin / Jean-Pierre Ferland
 Présentation des musiciens / Les 5
 Chacun dit je t'aime / Les 5
 La même gigue / les 5
 Gens du pays / les 5

Production team
 Musicians – Victor Angellilo, Marcel Beauchamp, Gaston Rochon, Gilles Schetagne, Marc Bélanger, Jean-Marie Benoît, Michel Dion, Ronald Faucher, Michel Fauteux, Jean-Claude Guérard, Jean-Pierre Lauzon, Daniel Lessard, Michel Le François, Yvan Ouellet, Richard Provençal, Libert Subirana, Serge Vallières
 Choir: France Castel, Louise Lemire, Louise Bédard and Margo McKinnon
 Musical directors: Gaston Rochon, Marcel Beauchamp, Michel Le François, Jean-Pierre Lauzon and Yvan Ouellet
 Director: The group ; Artistic counselor: Jean Bissonnette
 Sound: Michel Léveillée, Nick Blagona assisted by André Perry
 Mixing: Nick Blagona assisted by André Perry
 Studio: Fedco Audio Labs (Mobile studio), Le Studio Morin-Heighs
 Original recording: Sabin Brunet, S.N.B. in 1976
 Digital remastering: Bill Kipper, S.N.B. in 1991
 Production: GSI Musique and Kébec Disque; executive producers: Jean Bissonnette, Jean-Claude L'Espérance, Guy Latraverse
 Liner notes- Conception and graphic design: Kébec Disque; Presentation text: Lise Payette

References

External links
 Québec Info Musique: 
 GSI Musique: 

French-language albums
1976 compilation albums
Covers albums
Collaborative albums